The New Holland 250 is a NASCAR Xfinity Series race that takes place at Michigan International Speedway. First held in 1992, the race was a 200 mile event from its inception through 1999, and was extended to  starting with the 2000 race, it is held the day before the NASCAR Cup Series FireKeepers Casino 400.

The 2007 Carfax 250 was the first-ever carbon neutral stock car event. Through partnerships with The Conservation Fund and Carbonfund.org, Carfax offset all carbon emissions generated by the race, including carbon emissions from fans attending the race.

Past winners

Notes
1995: Mark Martin declared winner after Dale Jarrett was disqualified due to an unapproved engine part.
2003 and 2018: Races shortened due to rain.
2006 and 2021: Race extended due to NASCAR overtime. In 2021, it took three attempts.
2020: Race cancelled due to schedule changes resulting from the COVID-19 pandemic. Moved to Richmond Raceway

Multiple winners (drivers)

Multiple winners (teams)

Manufacturer wins

References

External links
 

1992 establishments in Michigan
NASCAR Xfinity Series races
 
Recurring sporting events established in 1992
Annual sporting events in the United States